A Doi is a village in southeastern Laos near the border with Vietnam. It is in Kaleum District in Sekong Province.

Populated places in Sekong Province